Koshithal is a Gram Panchayat and Village Located in Sahara tehsil, nearby Gangapur town in Bhilwara District of Ajmer division in the Indian State of Rajasthan.
It is located in Raipur Vidhan Sabha which governed by MLA Gayatri Kailash Trivedi Of Indian National Congress.
Koshithal is largest and one of the most important Gram Panchayat in Bhilwara District.
As of 2011, the population of Koshithal is 7153 having almost 1447 households. 
It is located 300 kms (186 miles) southwest of the state capital Jaipur and 60 kms (37 miles) away from District Headquarter Bhilwara.
The village have historically rich history contemporary with Maharana Pratap.
It is known for Koshithal Fort and for public cemetery where many War Martyr cremated.
It is belief that Koshithal has large number of War Martyr Cremated in Local Cemetery after Chittaurgarh in Rajasthan.

Nearest airports are Udaipur 120 kms (74 miles) and Jaipur 300 kms (186 miles) and nearest Railway Station is Bhilwara (BHL) and Charbhuja Road (CBG) which controlled by Ajmer division of North Western Railway zone.
It connected by Rajasthan State Road Transport Corporation and Other private travels agencies like Pasharvanath, ShreeNath, RK travels, Mundra travels etc operated buses to many parts of Rajasthan and Indian cities like Ahmedabad, Mumbai, Indore, Surat, Baroda etc.

Geography of Koshithal

The village is situated in NorthEast of the plains of Mewar Region.
Nearest cities are Gangapur, Amet, Bhilwara & Devgarh.

History

Koshithal village was established as Chunda State in Hindu Year 1705 by Narharidas grandson of Veer Shiromani Fatta Ji who was fifth generation of Mahrana Lakha's elder son Chunda.
Rawat Narharidas lived in Kelwa Jaagir of 210 villages in the era of Maharana Jagat Singh.
Narharidas united Koshithal and awarded with designation of "Umrao" in year 1735 by Maharana Raj Singh I due to his bravery and leadership.
Narharidas has four younger brothers: Singh Ji, Kesho Das, Raj Singh & Man Das.
In Hindu Year of 1976, Son of Jashwant Singh took control of Koshithal Thikana.
After Chatar Singh elder son Ummed Singh II took control of Koshithal Reign at that time Mewar State was ruling by Maharana Bhagwant Singh.
Ummed Singh has three sons Manohar Singh, Balwant Singh & Samudra Singh who got Ummedpura village.
Ummed Singh's younger brother was Kesar Singh who lived in Koshithal till last breath has one son Narendra Singh.
Some parts of Koshithal's history has been described in "Mewar ri Bigat" Book & Patta Bahi generated by Mewar Maharana Raj Singh.
According to these, In the Rule of Maharana Raj Singh II, Koshithal was ordered to participate in War against Marathas & to take admission in Army of Mewar State during attacks of Marathas on Mewar.
At that time Designated Thakur of Koshithal Reign Martyred in his young age.
Mewar Maharana fascinated with proud due to bravery of Koshithal Thakurani in War with Marathas and awarded her with "Hunkar Ki Kalangi" and this is only awarded to the Koshithal Reign in his all Reigns.
In the time of Thakur Ummed Singh, Justice was taken in the Court of Fort and in the same time Bada Mandir, Charbhuja Mandir, Nrasinghdwara, restoration of Devara's, many water bodies were constructed.

Demographics

According to the 2011 Census of India,
Koshithal had a population of 7153.
Males constituted 48.78% of the population and females 51.22%.
Average Sex Ratio of Koshithal village is 1050 which is higher than state average of 928
Child Sex Ratio for the Koshithal as per census is 961, higher than state average of 888.
Koshithal had an average literacy rate of 51.34%, lower than the state average of 66.11%. 63.54% of the males and 39.71% of females were literate.
15.66% of the population is under 6 years of age.
The substantial population of Koshithal was Schedule Caste (SC) constitutes 27.54% while Schedule Tribe (ST) were 4.18% and rest 68.28% are from other Categories like General, OBC, MBC, SBC etc.

Growth in population of Koshithal Village has been represented by population data of year 1991, 2001 and 2011.

 Source:

References 

Villages in Bhilwara district